David Kempton (born 1956) is an Australian Liberal National politician who was the member of the Legislative Assembly of Queensland for Cook from 2012 to 2015. He was appointed Assistant Minister for Aboriginal and Torres Strait Islander Affairs on 3 April 2012.

References

Liberal National Party of Queensland politicians
1956 births
Living people
Members of the Queensland Legislative Assembly
21st-century Australian politicians